Agram may refer to:

Places
 Agram (Croatia), the historic Austrian German name for Zagreb, Croatia
 Agram Township, Morrison County, Minnesota, U.S. 
 Agram, the Kanuri and Toubou name for the town of Fachi
 Agram mountain range, in northeastern Niger; see Fachi

Other
 Agram (card game)
 Agram 2000, a submachine gun from Croatia

See also